Wilmuth John Merkyl (June 2, 1885 – May 1, 1954) was an American stage and screen actor popular in early silent films. On stage he had also been a singer in light operettas. He was born in Iowa and died in California.

Selected filmography

 Gretna Green (1915)
 The Celebrated Scandal (1915)
 Niobe (1915)
 The Price (1915)
 Let's Get a Divorce (1918)
 A Man's World (1918)(*as John Merkyl)
 Fedora (1918)
 The Burden of Proof (1918)
 Suspicion (1918)
 The Whispered Name (1924)
 The Breaking Point (1924)
 Captain January (1924)
 The Unholy Three (1925)(*uncredited)
 The Merry Widow (1934)
 Atlantic Adventure (1935)
 The Buccaneer (1938)(*uncredited)
 Andy Hardy Meets Debutante (1940) (*uncredited)
 Reap the Wild Wind (1942)(*uncredited)
 They All Kissed the Bride (1942)(*uncredited)
 The Pride of the Yankees (1942) (*uncredited)
 Gentleman Jim (1942)(*uncredited)
 The Pearl of Death (1944) (*uncredited)
 Nob Hill (1945)(*uncredited)

References

External links
 
 
 

1885 births
1954 deaths
Male actors from Iowa
American male film actors
American male silent film actors
20th-century American male actors